Bhadram Koduko (Telugu: భద్రం కొడుకో) was a 1992 Telugu film. It is directed by Akkineni Kutumba Rao. Santhosh Reddy played the leadrole. Laya was starring in the cast. 
The story is based on the various problems faced by the street children and child labour in India particularly urban areas. The film won two Nandhi State Film Awards and two National Film Awards

Awards
Nandi Awards
Best Children's Film - Gold - V. Ramachandra Rao & Akkineni Kutumba Rao
Best Child Actor - Master Santosh Reddy

National Film Awards
Best Child Artist - Santosh Reddy
Best Feature Film in Telugu - V. Ramachandra Rao & Akkineni Kutumba Rao

References

1990s Telugu-language films
1992 films
Best Telugu Feature Film National Film Award winners